Metro Manila is a metropolitan area in the Philippines, consisting of 16 cities and a municipality, designated as the National Capital Region (NCR) of the country.

The mayors in Metro Manila are considered as the local chief executives of their respective localities and they also form part of the Metro Manila Council of the Metropolitan Manila Development Authority (MMDA).

Incumbent mayors

Lists of mayors
The following is the lists of mayors of Metro Manila's 17 local government units since 1901.

Caloocan

Las Piñas

Makati

Malabon

Mandaluyong

Manila

Marikina

Muntinlupa

Navotas

Parañaque

Pasay

Pasig

Pateros

Quezon City

San Juan

Taguig

Valenzuela

See also

Governor of Metro Manila

References

Manila
Mayors
 
Mayors